Exit(s) may refer to:

Architecture and engineering 
 Door
 Portal (architecture), an opening in the walls of a structure
 Emergency exit
 Overwing exit, a type of emergency exit on an airplane
 Exit ramp, a feature of a road interchange

Art and entertainment

Comics and magazines 
 Exit (comics), a French comic by Bernard Werber and Alain Mounier
 Exit (magazine), a British photography magazine

Film 
 Exit (1986 film), a Canadian film directed by Robert Ménard
 Exit (1996 film), an American film with a screenplay by Joe Augustyn
 Exit (Nöd ut), a 1996 Swedish short film starring Geir Hansteen Jörgensen
 Exit (2000 film), a French film directed by Olivier Megaton
 Exit (2006 film), a Swedish film starring Maria Langhammer
 Exit: una storia personale, a 2010 Italian film by Massimiliano Amato
 Exit (2011 film), an Australian-Canadian film directed by Marek Polgar
 Exit (2019 film), a South Korean action disaster film by Lee Sang-geun
 Exits (film), a 1979 Australian film about the 1975 dismissal of the ruling Labour government

Music
 The Exit, an American indie/punk/reggae band
 Exit (festival), a music festival in Serbia
 Exit (musician), David Shikalepo (born 1989), Namibian musician
 EXIT (performance art group), an experimental musical group that featured members of the punk band Crass
 Exit Records, an American record label

Albums 
 Exit (Alice album), or the title song, 1998
 Exit (Darin album), 2013
 Exit (k-os album), or the title song, "EXIT (Call Me)", 2002
 Exit (Pat Martino album), or the title song, 1977
 Exit (Rotten Sound album), or the title song, 2005
 Exit (Shugo Tokumaru album), 2007
 Exit (Tangerine Dream album), or the title song, 1981
 Exit, by Barney McAll, 1996
 Exits (album), by The Boxer Rebellion, 2005

Songs 
 "Exit" (Cupcakke song), 2017
 "Exit" (Porno Graffitti song), 2011
 "Exit" (U2 song), 1987
 "Exits" (song), by Foals, 2019
 "The Exit", by Lydia from Devil

Television 
 Exit (game show), in America (2013)
 Exit (South Korean TV series) (2018) 
 Exit (Norwegian TV series), starring Tobias Santelmann (2021)
 "eXit" (Mr. Robot), a 2019 episode

Theatre 
 EXIT Theatre, an alternative theatre in San Francisco, California, US
 Exit: An Illusion, a one-act play by Marita Bonner
 Exit, a 1984 play by the Catalan mime comedy group Tricicle

Video games 
 Exit (video game), a 2005 action/puzzle game

Computing
 Exit (command), a termination command in many operating systems
 exit (system call), a system call to terminate a running process
 EXIT chart, a technique to aid the construction of error-correcting codes
 .exit, a pseudo-top-level domain
 User exit, a predefined replaceable procedure in a software package

Organisations
 Exit (group), three European anti-Nazi organisations
 Exit (right-to-die organisation), an independent research group based in the United Kingdom
 Exit International, a pro-euthanasia group founded in Australia
 Dignity in Dying, formerly Exit, a pro-euthanasia group founded in the United Kingdom

Other uses
 Exit (economics), the opting out of future transactions
 EXIT procedure, ex utero intrapartum, an obstetrics procedure
 Exit strategy, a means of leaving one's current situation

See also
 
 XIT (disambiguation)
 No Exit (disambiguation)
 Egress (disambiguation)
 Quit (disambiguation)